Shuangxi may refer to:

 Double Happiness (calligraphy) (双喜), a Chinese calligraphic design

Mainland China 
All terms contain "双溪":
Towns
 Shuangxi, Ningde, in Pingnan County, Fujian
 Shuangxi, Jing'an County, Jiangxi
 Shuangxi, Hongjiang, Hunan
 Shuangxi, Shaanxi, in Chenggu County

Townships
 Shuangxi Township, Guzhang County, Hunan
 Shuangxi Township, Linwu County, Hunan
 Shuangxi Township, Jiangxi, in Shangyou County
 Shuangxi Township, Dazhu County, Sichuan
 Shuangxi Township, Hanyuan County, Sichuan
 Shuangxi Township, Qianwei County, Sichuan
 Shuangxi Township, Shehong County, Sichuan
 Shuangxi Township, Nanchong, in Yingshan County, Sichuan
 Shuangxi Township, Zhejiang, in Pan'an County

Subdistricts
 Shuangxi Subdistrict, Shunchang County, Fujian

Taiwan
 Shuangxi District (雙溪區), New Taipei, Taiwan

See also
 Double Happiness (disambiguation)